Juuru Parish is a former Estonian municipality located in Rapla County. It had a population of 1,627 (as of 31 March 2006) and an area of 152.4 km².

In 2017, Juuru Parish was merged into Rapla Parish.

Settlements
Juuru Parish has one small borough (Juuru, with 597 inhabitants) and 14 villages: Atla, Härgla, Helda, Hõreda, Jaluse, Järlepa, Kalda, Lõiuse, Mahtra, Maidla, Orguse, Pirgu, Sadala, and Vankse.

Gallery

References

External links